The following is a list of songs produced, co-produced and remixed by Swedish-Moroccan producer, songwriter and music executive RedOne.

Productions

1998–2006

2007

2008

2009

2010

2011

2012

2013

2014

2015–present

Additional production credits
 2006: "Move It (FIFA 2006 RedOne Mix)" (Sophie)
 2008: "Fashion" (Heidi Montag) 
 2009: "Would If I Could" (recorded by Menudo)
 2009: "Obvious" (recorded by Menudo)
 2009: "She's Bad" (recorded by Menudo)
 2009: "Piece of Me" (recorded by Varsity Fanclub)
 2010: "007 on You" (co-written by Lady Gaga; recorded by Esmée Denters)
 2010: "Dance-O-Holic" (recorded by Quincy Jagher)
 2010: "Fanatik" (recorded by Quincy Jagher)
 2010: "Summer's Not Hot" (recorded by Selena Gomez & the Scene)
 2011: "Hypnotico" (recorded by Jennifer Lopez)
 2011: "Say Jambo" (recorded by Mohombi)
 2011: "Starships" (Mohombi)
 2013: "Live Our Life" (recorded by ZO)
 2013: "Take Me Away" (recorded by Ki Fitzgerald)
 2013: "Gypsy" (recorded by Lady Gaga)
 2013: "Merry Christmas, Happy Holidays" (recorded by Midnight Red; 'N Sync cover)
 2014: "It's My Life" (recorded by Ahmed Chawki)
 2014: "We Are One (Ole Ola)" (recorded by Pitbull, Jennifer Lopez and Claudia Leitte)
 2014: "Expertease (Ready Set Go)" (recorded by Jennifer Lopez)
 2015: Whitney (film score)
 2015: "Hold The Line" (recorded by Rod Stewart)
 2016: "Angel Down (Work Tape)" (recorded by Lady Gaga)

Remixes
2004: Kevin Lyttle - "Turn Me On (Dance-Pop Remix)" (co-produced with Nely)
2005: Darin - "Step Up (RedOne Remix)" [featuring Jay-Json]
2006: Christina Milian - "L.O.V.E." (RedOne Remix) 
2006: Shakira - "Hips Don't Lie/Bamboo (2006 World Cup Mix)" [featuring Wyclef Jean]
2007: Christina Aguilera - "Candyman (RedOne Ultimix)"
2008: Robyn - "Handle Me (RedOne Remix)"
2008: New Kids on the Block - "Summertime (RedOne Remix)" [featuring Jadakiss]
2008: New Kids on the Block - "Dirty Dancing (RedOne Mix)"
2008: The Clique Girlz - "Smile (RedOne Remix)"
2008: Kat DeLuna - "Am I Dreaming" [w/o Akon]
2008: Kat DeLuna - "Run The Show" [No Rap]
2008: Lady Gaga - "Just Dance (Extended Version)"
2008: Lady Gaga - "Just Dance (RedOne Remix)" [featuring Kardinal Offishall]
2009: Enrique Iglesias - "Takin' Back My Love (Alternate Mix)" [featuring Sarah Connor]
2009: Kat DeLuna - "Put It On" [No Rap]
2009: Space Cowboy - "Falling Down (Extended Mix)" [featuring Chelsea from Paradiso Girls]
2009: Space Cowboy - "I Came 2 Party (Video Version)" [featuring Cinema Bizarre]
2009: Sugababes - "About A Girl (Radio Mix)" 
2010: Livvi Franc - "Automatik (RedOne Extended Remix)"
2010: Alexandra Burke - "Broken Heels (Single Mix)"
2010: Alexandra Burke - "Start Without You (Single Mix) / (Extended Mix)" [featuring Laza Morgan]
2010: Alexandra Burke - "The Silence (New Single Mix)"
2010: Enrique Iglesias - "I Like It" [No Rap]
2010: Far East Movement - "Like a G6 (RedOne Remix)" [featuring Mohombi, The Cataracs and Dev]
2010: Mohombi - "Bumpy Ride" [No Rap]
2010: Nicole Scherzinger - "Poison (New Main/Alternate Radio Version)"
2010: Usher - "More (RedOne/Jimmy Joker Remix)" / "(RedOne/Jimmy Joker Extended Remix)"
2011: 2NE1 - "I Don't Care (RedOne Remix)"
2011: Enrique Iglesias - "Dirty Dancer (Single Version)" [with Usher featuring Lil Wayne]
2011: Enrique Iglesias - "Dirty Dancer (Remix)" [with Usher featuring Lil Wayne and Nayer]
2011: Havana Brown - "We Run the Night (US Radio Edit, Remix)" [featuring Pitbull]
2011: Jennifer Lopez - "On The Floor" [No Rap]
2011: Mohombi - "Bumpy Ride (Soca Remix)" [featuring Pitbull and Machel Montano] 
2011: Taio Cruz - "There She Goes" [No Rap]
2012: Jennifer Lopez - "Dance Again" [No Rap]
2012: Jennifer Lopez - "Dance Again / Bailar Nada Más (Extended)" [featuring Pitbull]
2012: Nicki Minaj - "Pound The Alarm (UK Radio Version)"
2012: Porcelain Black - "Naughty Naughty (RedOne Extended Mix)"
2013: Emeli Sandé - "My Kind of Love (RedOne and Alex P Remix)"
2013: Jennifer Lopez - "Live It Up" [No Rap]
2013: Priyanka Chopra - "Exotic (Alternate Edit)" [featuring Pitbull]
2014: Sophia Del Carmen - "Lipstick (Radio Version)"
2015: Sophia Del Carmen - "Lipstick (Extended)" [featuring Pitbull]
2018: Alvaro Soler - "La Cintura (Remix)" [featuring Flo Rida and TINI]
2020: Ava Max - "Kings & Queens (Part 2)" [featuring Lauv and Saweetie]

Other-language versions
2007: Kat DeLuna - "Whine Up (Spanish)" [featuring Elephant Man]
2007: Kat DeLuna - "Run The Show (Spanish)" [featuring Shaka Dee/Don Omar]
2007: Kat DeLuna - "Como Un Sueño (Am I Dreaming's Spanish Version)"
2009: Enrique Iglesias - "Sans L'Ombre D'Un Remord (Takin' Back My Love's French Version)" [featuring Tyssem]
2011: Jennifer Lopez - "Ven A Bailar (On The Floor's Spanish Version)" [featuring Pitbull]
2011: Kat DeLuna - "Move Your Body (English version of "Muevete Muevete")"
2011: Mohombi - "Bumpy Ride (French)" 
2011: Mohombi - "Dirty Situation (French)" [Feat. Akon] " 
2012: Jennifer Lopez - "Bailar Nada Más (Dance Again's Spanish Version)"
2013: Ahmed Chawki - "Habibi I Love You" [featuring {Do(Dutch) / Kenza Farah(French) / Fani Drakopoulou(Greek) / Mandinga(Romanian) / Sophia Del Carmen(Spanish)} and Pitbull] " 
2014: Chawki - "Notre Moment (Time Of Our Lives's French Version)"
2014: Chawki - "Farhat Al 'Aalam / فرحة العالم (Time Of Our Lives's Arabic Version)"
2014: Chawki - "C'est Ma Vie (It's My Life's French Version)" [featuring Dr. Alban]
2014: Midnight Red - "Take Me Home (Spanglish)"
2014: Midnight Red - "Contigo (Take Me Home's Spanish Version)"
2014: Mohombi - "Movin' (French)" [featuring Birdman, KMC and Caskey]
2014: Mohombi - "Muevelo (Movin' 's Spanglish Version)" [featuring Alexis & Fido, KMC and Birdman]
2015: John Mamann - "Love Life (French)" [featuring Kika]
2016: RedOne - "Don't You Need Somebody" [featuring Enrique Iglesias, R. City, Aseel and Shaggy]
2022: Ayed, Nasser Al Kubaisi, Haneen Hussain - "Arhbo (Arabic Version)"
2022: Trinidad Cardona, Davido, AISHA - "Hayya Hayya (Better Together) (Spanish Version)"

References

External links

Production discographies
Pop music discographies
Discographies of Moroccan artists